Feelgood is a Swedish English language hit by Ola Svensson in 2008 appearing on his album Good Enough - The Feelgood Edition

The song reached number two on the Swedish Singles Chart on the chart dated 4 September 2008. The single went on to sell in excess of 40,000 copies domestically, and was certified 2× platinum by IFPI.

Charts

Weekly charts

Year-end charts

References

2008 singles
Ola Svensson songs
2008 songs
Songs written by Tony Nilsson
Songs written by Jonas Myrin